Peter Henrik Gemzøe (6 February 1811 – 3 October 1879) was a Danish painter and lithographer.

Early life and education
Gemzøe was born in Copenhagen, the son of copyist in the Treasury Carl Henrik Peter Gemzøe (1778–1840) and Andriette Frederikke Opitius ( – 1830). He was endorsed to pursuit his talent for drawing by Wilhelm Bendz and was admitted to the Royal Danish Academy of Fine Arts in 1829 while in the same time studying privately under Christoffer Wilhelm Eckersberg. He qualified for the Academy's Model School in 1832.

He belonged to Christen Købke's social circle and in 1832 created a number of lithographies based on Købke's portraits of N. L. Feilberg and F. C. Sibbern. In the late 1830s, he gave up painting altogether to completely focus on lithography.  He spent four years in Munich from 1840 where he studied under Hohe and Kohler.

Career
Gemzøe worked for Det kgl. stentrykkeri until 1837 and then for E.
Bærentzen & Co. from 1837 to 1840 and again from 1844 and he also worked for Tegner & Kittendorff. He specialized in portraits but he also created reproductions of many of Wilhelm Marstrand's paintings of scenes from Ludvig Holberg's plays and of popular works by Julius Exner, Carl Bloch and other artists of the time. He exhibited at Charlottenborg in 1833 and 1835.

Personal life
Gemzøe did not marry. He committed suicide in 1879 and is buried in Assistens Cemetery in Copenhagen.

References

External links

 Peter Gemzøe  at Kunstindeks Danmark

19th-century Danish artists
Danish lithographers
Burials at Assistens Cemetery (Copenhagen)
Suicides in Denmark
1811 births
1879 deaths